Pycnarmon sexpunctalis is a moth in the family Crambidae. It was described by George Hampson in 1912. It is found in the Democratic Republic of the Congo (Équateur), Nigeria and Sierra Leone.

The larvae feed on Strophanthus species.

References

Spilomelinae
Moths described in 1912
Moths of Africa